is a railway station on the Shinonoi Line in the city of Chikuma, Nagano Prefecture, Japan. It is operated by the East Japan Railway Company (JR East).

Lines
Obasute Station, which is served by trains on the Shinonoi Line, is located 54.2 km (33.7 miles) from the terminus of the line at Shiojiri Station.

Station layout
The station, which is unattended, is situated on a switchback, and has two side platforms connected by a footbridge. The station building is on the south platform. Through passenger trains not booked to call at Obasute do not use the switchback; however, freight trains make use of it if booked to cross a passenger service at this point.

Platforms

History 

The station opened on 1 November 1900. With the privatization of Japanese National Railways (JNR) on 1 April 1987, the station came under the control of JR East.

The station is named after nearby Mt. Ubasute, which in turn is named after the possibly mythical practice of ubasute, abandoning elderly relatives in the mountains to die.

Tourism developments
Although the station itself is unstaffed, local volunteers serve tea at weekends to the many tourists who visit for the express purpose of enjoying the extensive views over the Zenkoji Plain which are to be had from the northern platform. Additionally, since 2017 Obasute station has been a calling-point on the route of the luxury Shiki-Shima cruise train, which stops here overnight at the end of the first day of the spring and autumn 2-day cruises. In connection with this traffic an evening bar has been built on the station's south platform for the use of the cruise passengers and a viewing area provided on the north platform.

Passenger statistics
In the fiscal year 2018, the average daily number of passengers starting their journeys at Obasute was 64.

See also
List of railway stations in Japan

References

External links

 JR East station information 

Railway stations in Japan opened in 1900
Chikuma, Nagano
Railway stations in Nagano Prefecture
Shinonoi Line
Stations of East Japan Railway Company